Agalma is a genus of siphonophores in the family Agalmatidae. Siphonophores are colonial hydrozoans that feed on zooplankton.

Species 
 Agalma clausi Bedot, 1888
 Agalma elegans (Sars, 1846)
 Agalma okeni Eschscholtz, 1825

References

External links 
 

Agalmatidae
Taxa named by Johann Friedrich von Eschscholtz
Hydrozoan genera
Bioluminescent cnidarians